Darwin Brothers Rugby League Football Club is an Australian rugby league football club based in Anula, Northern Territory formed in 1958.They conduct teams for both Juniors & Seniors teams.

Notable  Juniors
 Frank Stokes (Manly Warringah Rugby League NSWRL 50 first grade games) 
 Peter Alley (Eastern Suburbs NSWRL now Sydney Roosters)
 Tom Nickels (Canberra Raiders NSWRL)

See also

Rugby league in the Northern Territory

References

External links
 

Sport in Darwin, Northern Territory
Rugby league teams in the Northern Territory
Rugby clubs established in 1958
1958 establishments in Australia